Palintropa peregrina is a moth in the family Gelechiidae. It was described by Clarke in 1971. It is found on Rapa Iti.

References

Gelechiinae
Moths described in 1971